Murphysboro Elks Lodge, also known as Murphysboro Event Center, is a historic meeting hall and former Elks lodge in Murphysboro, Illinois. The lodge was built in 1916 for Murphysboro Elks Lodge No. 572, which was chartered in 1900. Architect Rudolph Zerse Gill designed the building in the Classical Revival style. The red brick building features a limestone foundation and terra cotta decorations. The front entrance is topped by an oval containing an elk head and decorated with fruit garlands. The second story features a porch supported by classical columns. A dentillated and bracketed entablature encircles the front half of the building above the porch.

The building was listed on the National Register of Historic Places in 2005.

References

Clubhouses on the National Register of Historic Places in Illinois
Neoclassical architecture in Illinois
Buildings and structures completed in 1916
Buildings and structures in Jackson County, Illinois
Elks buildings
National Register of Historic Places in Jackson County, Illinois
1916 establishments in Illinois